Gałęzów may refer to the following places:
Gałęzów, Chełm County in Lublin Voivodeship (east Poland)
Gałęzów, Lublin County in Lublin Voivodeship (east Poland)
Gałęzów, Pomeranian Voivodeship (north Poland)